Silvano Vos (born 16 March 2005) is a Dutch professional footballer who plays for Jong Ajax.

Club career 
Starting the 2021–22 season as a regular with the Ajax youth team, most notably in the UEFA Youth League, Silvano Vos made his professional debut for Jong Ajax on 4 February 2022, replacing Youri Baas during a 2–1 home Eerste Divisie win against Jong AZ.

References

External links

2005 births
Living people
Dutch footballers
Netherlands youth international footballers
Association football midfielders
Sportspeople from Amsterdam
Jong Ajax players
Eerste Divisie players